Alfred Blaisdell (October 25, 1875 – March 8, 1946) was a North Dakota Republican Party politician who served as the Secretary of State of North Dakota from 1907 to 1910. He was first elected to the position in 1906, was re-elected in 1908, but did not seek re-election in 1910. His nephew, Josiah Blaisdell, Jr., served in the North Dakota Legislative Assembly during the 1930s.

References 

1875 births
1946 deaths
Secretaries of State of North Dakota